Kupchik is a rural locality (a selo) in Cherdynsky District, Perm Krai, Russia. The population was 24 as of 2010. There are 4  streets.

Geography 
Kupchik is located 38 km northwest of Cherdyn (the district's administrative centre) by road.

References 

Rural localities in Cherdynsky District